Review Your Choices is the fourth album by American doom metal band Pentagram. It was released in 1999 by Italian label Black Widow Records. Joe Hasselvander played all the instruments, while Bobby Liebling provided all lead and backing vocals. The spine reads "Twelve new Skeletons for your Closet of Dementia".

Track listing
(Songwriters listed in brackets.)
 "Burning Rays" (Bobby Liebling) – 2:36
 "Change of Heart" (Joe Hasselvander/Liebling) – 5:28
 "Living in a Ram's Head" (Liebling) – 2:35
 "Gorgon's Slave" (Hasselvander/Liebling) – 6:34
 "Review Your Choices" (Liebling) – 3:22
 "The Diver" (Liebling) – 2:52
 "The Bees" (Liebling) – 2:29
 "I Am Vengeance" (Hasselvander/Liebling) – 5:25
 "Forever My Queen" (Liebling) – 2:38
 "Mow You Down" (Hasselvander/Liebling) – 3:22
 "Downhill Slope" (Liebling) – 3:58
 "Megalania" (Hasselvander/Liebling) – 7:02
 "Gilla?" (Mike Hounshell) – 0:53

Lineup 
Bobby Liebling – all lead and backing vocals
Joe Hasselvander – all instruments
Mike Hounshell – recording engineer

1999 albums
Pentagram (band) albums
Season of Mist albums